AŞTİ (Ankara Intercity Coach Terminal) is the intercity bus terminal of Ankara, Turkey.

Geography
Its address is Beştepeler Mahallesı, Mevlana Bulvarı, No:82 Söğütözü, Çankaya.

The terminal
The terminal was put into service in 1997. It is a two-storey terminal where the lower floor is reserved for incoming traffic and the upper floor is reserved for  outgoing traffic. Daily traffic is about 2500 busses.

Main roads from Ankara
Ankara is situated more or less at the center of Turkey. There are five main roads from Ankara.

See also
List of highways in Turkey

References

External links
 aşti otogar

Transportation in Ankara
Buildings and structures in Ankara
Çankaya, Ankara
Transport infrastructure completed in 1997
Transit centers in Ankara
Bus stations in Turkey
Public transport in Turkey